Central Mackay Coast, an interim Australian bioregion, is located in Queensland, and comprises .

The bioregion has the code CMC. There are six subregions.

See also

Geography of Australia

References

Further reading
 Thackway, R and I D Cresswell (1995) An interim biogeographic regionalisation for Australia : a framework for setting priorities in the National Reserves System Cooperative Program Version 4.0 Canberra : Australian Nature Conservation Agency, Reserve Systems Unit, 1995. 

Biogeography of Queensland
IBRA regions
Flora of Queensland
Floristic regions
Botany in Queensland